The 1953 World Table Tennis Championships – Swaythling Cup (men's team) was the 20th edition of the men's team championship.  

England won the gold medal defeating Hungary 5–3 in the final. Czechoslovakia and France both won a bronze medal after finishing second in their respective groups.

Medalists

Swaythling Cup tables

Group A

Group B

Final

See also
List of World Table Tennis Championships medalists

References

-